Uni High may refer to:

University High School, Melbourne
University Laboratory High School of Urbana, Illinois
Other University High Schools also use it as an abbreviated name.